Kallipefki (Greek: Καλλιπεύκη) is a village located on a plateau on the west side of the lower Mount of Olympus, in the prefecture of Larissa and the municipality of Gonni. Kallipefki has a population of about 540 and is located 1.054 metres (3.458 feet) above sea level. It is about 9 kilometers far from ancient Leivithra, 23 kilometers far from the town of Gonnoi, 58 kilometers from Larissa and 130 kilometers from Thessaloniki.

The name derives from the word "kalli" which means fair/good and "pefko" which means pine, due to the beautiful pine forests that surrounds it. The old name of the village before 1927 was "Nezeros", which probably derives from the Slavic word "ezer", which means lake. The soil of the plateau of Kalipefki that is fit for cultivation today was created in 1911 after the Askouris (Askourida) lake had been drained. The size of the lake was approximately 5.500 acres.

Kallipefki was founded in late Roman times and was one of the 10th century AD bishop diocese, dependent on the bishop of Larissa. Due to its strategic location in the lower Olympus mountain, it became an important position of Greek resistance ("thieves") during the Turkish occupation.

In Kallipefki was born in 1760 Stergios Hatzikostas, a trader who lived in Vienna who is most known for being the editor, publisher and friend of Rigas Feraios. 
Some of the touristic sights are "Agia Triada" and "Patomeni"

In Kallipefki is held every two years the "Olympus Storytelling Festival", a collaboration of the University of Thessaly, the Hellenic Group of Storytelling Friends (POFA) and the Cultural Association of Kallipefki (MESAK).

References
Καλλιπεύκη Λάρισας

Populated places in Larissa (regional unit)